The Foundation for Ecological Security (FES) is a registered non-profit organization based in Anand, Gujarat, India working towards the ecological restoration and conservation of land and water resources in ecologically fragile, degraded, and marginalized regions of India, through concentrated and collective efforts of village communities.

FES has been involved in assisting the restoration, management, and governance of Common Property Land Resources since 1986. The organization uses a holistic approach to resource management by intertwining principles of nature conservation and local self-governance in order to accelerate ecological restoration, as well as improve the living conditions of the poor.

Most of FES’s efforts are concentrated in the dryland regions of the country; however, the landscapes worked on are as diverse as scrublands, tidal mudflats, dense forests, ravines, grasslands, farm fields, and water bodies.

Mission
Registered under the Societies Registration Act XXI 1860, the Foundation for Ecological Security was set up in 2001 to strengthen the “massive and critical task of ecological restoration” and improve the governance of natural resources in India.

According to their website, the mission statement of the organization is, “As ‘ecological security’ is the foundation of sustainable and equitable development, the Foundation for Ecological Security (FES) is committed to strengthening, reviving or restoring, where necessary, the process of ecological succession and the conservation of land, forest and water resources in the country.”

Given its presence at various levels of governance – from villages and districts to the state and national level – FES is well poised to voice local concerns on regional, national and global platforms.

Strategic Overview
For two decades, FES has steadfastly sought to improve the ecological and economic outcomes for India's rural people by pursuing the Promise of Commons; a sustainable, longer-term vision for the gender-equitable and inclusive community-led governance of our natural resources.

India's declared national and global commitments enable a greater alignment between legal mandate, policy intent, local capacity, and agency and leadership of local communities. For true transformation, there is a compelling need to change the system so that programmes and policies connect ecosystems to rural economic opportunities.

Our presence at various levels of governance, from villages and districts to the state and national level, and a deep understanding of the existing structural barriers that are deeply embedded in the system, has led to a further refining of FES' role: to be a convenor, connector and enabler, focused on institutional sustainability for change within and across states. Our work may thus be regarded against four action areas:

1. Catalyse collaborative action to build a shared and vivid imagination, improve access to data, knowledge and other assets, and enhance capacities to design and sustain multi-actor engagement;

2. Strengthen the agency of actors by creating a shared infrastructure to improve access to data, learning assets, and other resources, building a co-creation environment for solutions and leveraging government architecture for work at scale;

3. Enable public and policy support for Commons by generating evidence, building a positive narrative, and strengthening strategic communication to embed the Commons as a priority in policies and programmes; and

4. Engender improved social inclusion and accountability by strengthening local networks and working with governments to establish mechanisms for more responsive and accountable functioning.

The four action areas and the system shifts they work to achieve are interconnected and mutually reinforcing, helping to ensure that the changes are institutionalised and endure.

Ecological restoration and livelihoods

Most contemporary initiatives on livelihood promotion do not take into account the threshold limits of ecosystems and instead push for an exploitative trend that is obviously untenable in the long run. FES, however, strives to highlight the threshold limits of the given agro-ecological system so as to aid communities in determining consumption levels within the ecological capacity of the area, by highlighting natural resource-based livelihood options that are ecologically sound and economically rewarding.

FES’s work with land, water and people is governed by a deep understanding of interrelationships – inter-relationships between natural and human systems, between different ecosystems within a landscape, and between different elements within an ecosystem, as also the inter-linkages between Commons, livestock, and agriculture.

The organization's efforts focus on strengthening systemic drivers (such as soil, moisture, nutrients, pollinators, and biodiversity) and the natural inter-linkages between various elements of the farming system, while parallelly aiding village communities in strengthening community institutions for local self-governance and in this way, adding to the resilience of both rural landscapes and people's endeavors.

Strengthening village institutions

FES works through local self-governance institutions to promote the judicious management of natural resources, partnering with village communities committed to restoring ecosystems and landscapes, and crafting suitable institutional spaces which safeguard the interests of the poor.

In various parts of the country, alongside community institutions, FES joins hands with civil society, academia, local elected representatives, and government functionaries to promote informed stewardship and concerted action towards restoring ecological health. FES also leverages funds available under Rural Employment Guarantee Programs and channels their effective utilization to restore degraded landscapes and revitalize local self-governance institutions.

FES has considerable experience in building capacities of representatives of village institutions, Panchayats, government and non-government officials, who can steer development processes at the village level in areas of local governance and stewardship of natural resources. In 2011, FES initiated Prakriti Karyashala or rural colleges to assist communities and local self-governance institutions in shaping and translating their visions of local development and filling the gaps in knowledge, leadership, and skills. The Karyashala offers programs to Village Forest Committees, along forest fringes in Rajasthan and Orissa, to village institutions integrating MGNREGA and managing Commons in Rajasthan and Andhra Pradesh, and on the watershed, associations planning to monitor hydrological changes and craft usage regulations in Andhra Pradesh.

Common pool resources

FES is one of the largest organizations focused on giving India's rural poor rights to common land (“the Commons”). Commons in India have been continuously projected as 'wastelands' and diverted for alternate uses such as biofuel cultivation, corporate contract farming, and industrial zones. While more than 90% of India's population depends on the Commons for their livelihood, few have formal rights to these resources. To challenge the growing threats that Commons face from their reallocation, overexploitation, and encroachment, FES launched the ‘Commons Initiative’ in 2009. The Initiative aims to build strategic collaborations and bring together practitioners, decision-makers, and scholars for a long-term campaign that would influence policy and programmatic action on Commons in India. In this regard, FES works towards representing landless communities, organizing long-term leasing arrangements, and securing tenure with State governments.

Studies and analyses

FES undertakes studies to help locate its work in the larger context and designs pursuits that are both grounded and technically rigorous while providing a sound basis for influencing policy. The studies are designed to engage local communities in search of suitable solutions and build on their knowledge for informed community-level action for ecological restoration, natural resource management, and institution building. A comprehensive framework has also been developed to study ecological, social, and economic issues in representative locations and to monitor changes over a period of time in order to upgrade the effectiveness of our work at the village and landscape level.
FES has a well-developed Geographic Information System (GIS) and Remote Sensing Facility that supports these studies with spatial information, representation, and analysis. In 2010, FES launched Indian Biodiversity Information System (IBIS), a web-based modular and searchable portal to provide reliable species-level information on a single user-friendly platform. Catering to a wide range of stakeholder groups, ranging from amateur wildlife enthusiasts to serious researchers, conservationists, and educationists, IBIS aims at becoming a crucial tool for achieving conservation goals in the subcontinent.

Outreach
As of March 2022, FES, along with its Partner NGOs works with 41,880 village institutions, assisting them in better environmental stewardship of 12.52 million acres of common lands and impacting lives of 24.8 million people across 14 states of India, namely Andhra Pradesh, Chhattisgarh, Gujarat, Himachal Pradesh, Jharkhand, Karnataka, Madhya Pradesh, Maharashtra, Manipur, Meghalaya, Nagaland, Odisha, Rajasthan and Telangana.  

The central theme of the work done by FES revolves around intertwining principles of nature conservation and strengthening village institutions so as to directly improve the living conditions of the poor and the marginalized. FES support Panchayats and their subcommittees, Village Forest Committees, Gramya Jungle Committees, Water Users Associations, and Watershed Committees. Regardless of the form of the institution, FES strives for a future where local village communities determine and move towards desirable land-use based on principles of conservation and social justice.

Networking and collaborations
FES collaborates with several practitioners and academic bodies engaged in ecological restoration, community institutions, and rural livelihoods.

FES partners with the Dakshin Foundation to publish Common Voices and Current Conservation. With Kalpavriksh, FES brings out the Protected Area Update and Forest Case Update.

In collaboration with Collective Action and Property Rights (CAPRI), FES seeks to advance common interests on collective action and property rights of communities through developing effective advocacy, communication, and training materials.

FES collaborates with different universities: Washington University in St. Louis, to study subjects related to systems dynamics, energy conservation, coupled human and natural systems; Clemson University, on hydrological studies; University of Michigan, Ann Arbor, and University of Illinois Urbana-Champaign, on forest resource institutions and climate change.

FES anchors the Rain-fed Livestock Network (RLN), a consortium of NGOs which works to highlight issues related to livestock rearers in rain-fed areas of India. FES is also a member of the ‘Future of Conservation’ consortium, and the Revitalization of the Rain-fed Agricultural Network.

FES is currently a member of the International Union for Conservation of Nature International Land Coalition, International Association for the Study on the Commons, International Society of Ecological Economics (ISEE) and its Indian chapter, the Indigenous and Community Conserved Areas (ICCA) Consortium, and the United Nations Economic and Social Council.

Funding partners
FES has been supported by many funding partners over the years, including Arghyam, Concern Worldwide, The Duleep Matthai Nature Conservation Trust, Fondation Ensemble, Ford Foundation, Department of Rural Development (Government of Andhra Pradesh), Department of Rural Development (Government of Gujarat), Department of Rural Development (Government of Andhra Rajasthan), Grow-Trees, Hilton Foundation, Irrigation, and Command Area Development (I&CAD) Department (Government of Andhra Pradesh), ITC – Sunehra Kal Initiative, National Bank for Agriculture and Rural Development (NABARD), Omidyar Network, Royal Bank of Scotland Foundation, Rufford Small Grant Programme, Sir Dorabji Tata Trust and the Allied Trusts (SDTT), Jamsetji Tata Trust (JTT), Sir Ratan Tata Trust (SRTT), Water and Sanitation Management Organisation (WASMO), UNDP-GEF Small Grants Programme (SGP), and GIZ.

Awards
FES was a recipient of the Skoll Award for Social Entrepreneurship in 2015, and Jagdeesh Rao was honored during the awards ceremony as part of the Skoll World Forum in Oxford, England on 16 April 2015.

In 2013, FES was awarded the Times of India Social Impact Award 2012 in the Environment category. It was jointly shared with Dhan Foundation.

On the World Day to Combat Desertification (17 June) the Foundation for Ecological Security was awarded the United Nations Convention to Combat Desertification (UNCCD) instituted Land for Life Award 2013 for its work on assisting village communities in the sustainable management of common lands in India.

The Foundation for Ecological Security (FES) is also the recipient of the prestigious Elinor Ostrom International Award on Collective Governance of the Commons for the year 2013, for outstanding contribution to the practice of Commons governance.

See also

References

External links
Foundation for Ecological Security
National Dairy Development Board's article on the Foundation for Ecological Security

Non-profit organisations based in India
Environmental organisations based in India
Wetlands organizations